Tyler Isaac Newton (born May 13, 1982) is an American professional basketball player who plays for the Rera Kamuy Hokkaido of the Japan Basketball League (JBL Super League).

High school 

Newton attended John Burroughs High School in Burbank, California, where he lettered in volleyball and water polo while earning a scholastic achievement award.  Newton began playing organized basketball during his sophomore year in high school, but failed to make the varsity squad and was never used in a game.  By his senior year, Newton was scoring career bests of 33 points and 24 rebounds.  The big stats were no fluke, as he grabbed 24 rebounds twice during the season and was the fourth leading rebounder in the entire Los Angeles area that year, leading his team to a 17–6 record en route to a league title, and Honorable Mention All-Foothill Conference honors.  Newton was inducted into the John Burroughs Middle School Hall of Fame in 2006.

College 

After a season with the Antelope Valley (California) Marauders, Newton transferred to Shasta College in Redding, California, where he led the Knights to a 28–6 record while being named to the All-Conference team and honored as an All-State player.

Newton was recruited by the University of the Pacific in Stockton, California and redshirted during the 2002–2003 season.  The next season, Newton averaged 7 points and 4 rebounds per game coming off the bench.  Eight of his 10 double-digit scoring efforts came in games in which he did not start, including a 22-point performance in just 16 minutes of action.  Newton was voted Most Inspirational by his teammates and earned All-Big West Conference Honorable Mention.  The following season, Newton continued his quiet leadership in scoring and rebounding, while helping his team to their second NCAA Tournament appearance in as many years.

Professional career 

Newton is an experienced international athlete, having played for teams in countries such as Australia (Hervey Bay Hurricanes), Austria (Allianz Swans Gmunden), France (JDA Dijon Mustard) and Japan (Rera Kamuy Hokkaido).  In the United States, he has played with the San Jose Skyrockets and Hollywood Fame of the ABA and the Santa Barbara Breakers of the IBL.

In 2007, Newton was selected as one of two foreign (non-Japanese) players to lead a new Japanese franchise in the city of Sapporo.  Newton joined Japanese superstar Takehiko Orimo for the inaugural season of the Rera Kamuy Hokkaido and, after a season of adjustment, they have turned the team into a leading force in the JBL.  Newton and his team have the enthusiastic support of local residents, who are excited to have professional basketball in their city.  Newton leads his team in scoring (17 points per game), rebounding (12 per game), blocked shots (1.4 per game) and being 4 feet taller than everyone else.

He is also among the JBL League leaders in scoring, field goal percentage, blocked shots and rebounding.  His accomplishments were acknowledged in 2007, as he was one of only four foreign (non-Japanese) players to be selected for the JBL League All-Star Game, which featured 24 of the top players in Japan.  In 2008, Newton became a two-time All-Star and was the second-leading vote-getter among foreign players.  Newton helped lead the East to a 120–98 victory by scoring 18 points and grabbing 9 rebounds in only 18 minutes of play. In the off-season of 2009 he played for the Chico Rage in the highly competitive Sacramento Professional Development League (SPDL) where he averaged 25.8 pts. 8.5 rebs. and 2 blocked shots a game going up against NBA players Donte Greene, Jason Thompson, and Matt Barnes.

From 2010 to 2012, Newton played for Link Tochigi Brex of the JBL.

Player profile 

Newton is a versatile, all-purpose front court player who mostly plays the power forward position, but has also played center, small forward, and point forward throughout his career.  Newton is considered one of the best shooters in Japan, hitting over 60 percent of his field goal attempts.  Newton briefly struggled with his free throw shooting early in the 2008–09 JBL season.  However, by converting 80 percent (12/15) of his free throw attempts against a "Hack-a-Newt" defense by the Mitsubishi Diamond Dolphins, Newton has proven to be a solid free throw shooter as well.

On offense, Newton utilizes his quickness, size, and strength to get past defenders. Newton is known for his exceptional agility and upper body strength, which puts him among the leaders at finishing down low in the paint.  He is a solid rebounder who regularly ranks among the league leaders in rebounds.  His overall skill sets and on-court play have led to many comparisons to NBA legends Dirk Nowitzki, Kevin McHale, and Kevin Garnett.

Personal life 

During his high school years at John Burroughs High School, Newton was a letterwinner in basketball, water polo, and swimming.

.

Career statistics

College 

|-
| style="text-align:left;"| 2000–01
| style="text-align:left;"| Antelope CC
| 32 || 32 || ??.? || .??? || .??? || .?? || 3.9 || ?.? || ?.? || ?.? || 5.1
|-
| style="text-align:left;"| 2001–02
| style="text-align:left;"| Shasta CC
| ?? || ?? || ??.? || .??? || .??? || .?? || 6.8 || ?.? || ?.? || 1.7 || 13.6
|-
| style="text-align:left;"| 2002–03
| style="text-align:left;"| Pacific
|colspan=11 align=center|Did not play—redshirt season
|-
| style="text-align:left;"| 2003–04
| style="text-align:left;"| Pacific
| 33 || 6 || 19.7 || .605 || .250 || .652 || 3.5 || 1.2 || .5 || .7 || 7.3
|-
| style="text-align:left;"| 2004–05
| style="text-align:left;"| Pacific
| 31 || 12 || 21.7 || .596 || .286 || .616 || 4.5 || 1.7 || .4 || .4 || 7.3

Professional 

|-
| style="text-align:left;"| 2005
| style="text-align:left;"| Hervey Bay Hurricanes
| ?? || ?? || ??.? || .??? || .??? || .?? || ??.? || ?.? || ?.? || ?.? || ??.?
|-
| style="text-align:left;"| 2007
| style="text-align:left;"| Santa Barbara Breakers
| ?? || ?? || ??.? || .??? || .??? || .?? || ??.? || ?.? || ?.? || ?.? || ??.?
|-
| style="text-align:left;"| 2007–08
| style="text-align:left;"| Rera Kamuy Hokkaido (JBL)
| ?? || ?? || ??.? || .??? || .??? || .?? || ??.? || ?.? || ?.? || ?.? || ??.?
|-
| style="text-align:left;"| 2008–09
| style="text-align:left;"| Rera Kamuy Hokkaido (JBL)
| 35 || 30 || 24.3 || .592 || .167 || .559 || 8.1 || 1.7 || 0.8 || 0.7 || 14.8

Awards and honors
 Foothill League Champ: 2000
 LA Times All-Valley Team: 2000
 SoCalHoops Top 25 Senior Centers/Post Players: 2000
 First Team All-Golden Valley Conference: 2002
 California Community College All-State Team: 2002
 All Big West Honorable Mention: 2004
 All Big West Honorable Mention: 2005
 Most Inspirational Player: 2005
 John Burroughs HS Hall of Fame: 2006
 JBL (Japan) Super League All-Star Team: 2007
 ABA (Asia) Championship All-Tournament Team: 2008
 JBL (Japan) Super League All-Star Team: 2008

References

External links

 Japanese League profile
Pacific Tigers bio

1982 births
Living people
American expatriate basketball people in Austria
American expatriate basketball people in Australia
American expatriate basketball people in France
American expatriate basketball people in Japan
American men's basketball players
Antelope Valley Marauders men's basketball players
Basketball players from New York (state)
Kawasaki Brave Thunders players
Levanga Hokkaido players
Pacific Tigers men's basketball players
Power forwards (basketball)
Sportspeople from Burbank, California
Swans Gmunden players
Utsunomiya Brex players